The Parachute Building in Pratt, Kansas, located at 40131 Barker Ave., was built in 1942 during World War II by the US Army Corps of Engineers.  It was listed on the National Register of Historic Places in 2009.

It was a parachute rigging and cleaning facility.

References

Military facilities on the National Register of Historic Places in Kansas
Buildings and structures completed in 1942
Pratt County, Kansas
World War II on the National Register of Historic Places
Air transportation buildings and structures on the National Register of Historic Places